The Spring Street station is a local station on the IRT Lexington Avenue Line of the New York City Subway. Located at the intersection of Lafayette Street and Spring Street in SoHo and Little Italy, Manhattan, it is served by  trains at all times, <6> trains during weekdays in the peak direction, and  trains during late night hours.

The Spring Street station was constructed for the Interborough Rapid Transit Company (IRT) as part of the city's first subway line, which was approved in 1900. Construction of the line segment that includes the Spring Street station started on September 12 of the same year. The station opened on October 27, 1904, as one of the original 28 stations of the New York City Subway. The station's platforms were lengthened in the late 1950s.

The Spring Street station contains two side platforms and four tracks; express trains use the inner two tracks to bypass the station. The station was built with tile and mosaic decorations, which are continued along the platform extensions. The station contains exits to Spring Street at the center of each platform. The platforms are not connected to each other within fare control. The station contains elevators from the street, which make it compliant with the Americans with Disabilities Act of 1990.

History

Construction and opening 

Planning for the city's first subway line dates to the Rapid Transit Act, authorized by the New York State Legislature in 1894. The subway plans were drawn up by a team of engineers led by William Barclay Parsons, chief engineer of the Rapid Transit Commission. It called for a subway line from New York City Hall in lower Manhattan to the Upper West Side, where two branches would lead north into the Bronx. A plan was formally adopted in 1897, and legal challenges were resolved near the end of 1899. The Rapid Transit Construction Company, organized by John B. McDonald and funded by August Belmont Jr., signed Contract 1 with the Rapid Transit Commission in February 1900, in which it would construct the subway and maintain a 50-year operating lease from the opening of the line. In 1901, the firm of Heins & LaFarge was hired to design the underground stations. Belmont incorporated the Interborough Rapid Transit Company (IRT) in April 1902 to operate the subway.

The Spring Street station was constructed as part of the IRT's original line, particularly the section from Chambers Street to Great Jones Street. Construction on this section of the line began on July 10, 1900, and was awarded to Degnon-McLean Contracting Company. By late 1903, the subway was nearly complete, but the IRT Powerhouse and the system's electrical substations were still under construction, delaying the system's opening. The Spring Street station opened on October 27, 1904, as one of the original 28 stations of the New York City Subway from City Hall to 145th Street on the Broadway–Seventh Avenue Line.

Service changes and station renovations 

After the initial system was completed in 1908, the station was served by local trains along both the West Side (now the Broadway–Seventh Avenue Line to Van Cortlandt Park–242nd Street) and East Side (now the Lenox Avenue Line). West Side local trains had their southern terminus at City Hall during rush hours and South Ferry at other times, and had their northern terminus at 242nd Street. East Side local trains ran from City Hall to Lenox Avenue (145th Street).

In 1909, to address overcrowding, the New York Public Service Commission proposed lengthening platforms at stations along the original IRT subway. As part of a modification to the IRT's construction contracts, made on January 18, 1910, the company was to lengthen station platforms to accommodate ten-car express and six-car local trains. In addition to $1.5 million (equivalent to $ million in ) spent on platform lengthening, $500,000 was spent on building additional entrances and exits. It was anticipated that these improvements would increase capacity by 25 percent. The northbound platform was extended to the south. Six-car local trains began operating in October 1910. The Lexington Avenue Line opened north of Grand Central–42nd Street in 1918, thereby dividing the original line into an "H"-shaped system. All local trains were sent via the Lexington Avenue Line, running along the Pelham Line in the Bronx. 

In December 1922, the Transit Commission approved a $3 million project to lengthen platforms at 14 local stations along the original IRT line, including Spring Street and seven other stations on the Lexington Avenue Line. The commission postponed the platform-lengthening project in September 1923, at which point the cost had risen to $5.6 million.

The city government took over the IRT's operations on June 12, 1940. In April 1960, work began on a $3,509,000 project (equivalent to $ million in ) to lengthen platforms at seven of these stations to accommodate ten-car trains.

Station layout 

Like other local stations, Spring Street has four tracks and two side platforms. The 6 stops here at all times, rush-hour and midday <6> trains stop here in the peak direction; and the 4 stops here during late nights. The two express tracks are used by the 4 and 5 trains during daytime hours. The platform extensions are at the front ends of the original platforms: the southbound platform was extended southward and the northbound platform was extended northward. This resulted in the two platforms being offset from each other. Both platforms are slightly curved.

Spring Street had a fifth center track at the time of its opening. This track did not last long; it was reportedly disconnected and removed in 1906, only two years after the subway opened. The trackway is now used as the location of a mechanical room.

Design

As with other stations built as part of the original IRT, the tunnel is covered by a "U"-shaped trough that contains utility pipes and wires. Each platform consists of  concrete slabs, beneath which are drainage basins. The original platforms contain circular, cast-iron Doric-style columns spaced every , while the platform extensions contain I-beam columns. Additional columns between the tracks, spaced every , support the jack-arched concrete station roofs. There is a  gap between the trough wall and the platform walls, which are made of -thick brick covered over by a tiled finish.

The original decorative scheme consists of blue tile station-name tablets, light blue tile bands, a white terracotta cornice, and light blue terracotta plaques. The mosaic tiles at all original IRT stations were manufactured by the American Encaustic Tile Company, which subcontracted the installations at each station. The decorative work was performed by tile contractor Manhattan Glass Tile Company and terracotta contractor Atlantic Terra Cotta Company. The ceilings of the original platforms and fare control areas contain plaster molding. The station has small "S" cartouches with two poppies from 1904, made by Atlantic Terra Cotta, and large mosaic tablets by Heins & LaFarge, also from 1904. Other small "S" and "Spring St" mosaics are newer.

Where the platforms have been extended, the walls have green tiles and a darker green trim line with "SPRING ST" written on it in black sans serif font at regular intervals.

Exits
Spring Street has four entrances, two to each platform. The northbound entrances are at either eastern corner of Lafayette and Spring Streets, while the southbound entrances are at either western corner of the same intersection. The entrance to the southwestern corner is located within the building line at 60 Spring Street, a building built in 1924 for the East River Savings Bank.

In popular culture 
This station is featured in the 2008 film Cloverfield. The scene was not filmed there, however.  The station is featured in the season 3 episode, "Lo-Fi", in the television show Criminal Minds.

References

Further reading

External links 

 
 Station Reporter — 4 train
 Station Reporter — 6 Train
 Forgotten NY — Original 28 – NYC's First 28 Subway Stations
 Spring Street uptown entrance from Google Maps Street View
 Spring Street downtown entrance from Google Maps Street View
 Platforms from Google Maps Street View

IRT Lexington Avenue Line stations
New York City Subway stations in Manhattan
Railway stations in the United States opened in 1904
1904 establishments in New York City
SoHo, Manhattan